Charles Jefferson may refer to:

Charles E. Jefferson, former Democratic member of the Illinois House of Representatives
Charles Edward Jefferson, American Congregational clergyman